Patrick Blanc (born June 3, 1953, Paris) is a French botanist who works at the French National Centre for Scientific Research, where he specializes in plants from tropical forests. He is the modern innovator of the green wall, specifically, 
he invented the modern vertical hydroponics garden, which distinguishes it from its predecessors (aka. the Green Wall, Botanical Brick invented by Professor Stanley Hart White at the University of Illinois Urbana-Champaign in 1938).

Patrick Blancs contemporary patents are responsible for modernizing and popularizing the garden type. Blanc describes his vertical garden as follows:

This system exemplifies Blanc's ideas as a scientist and also the 15th target of the Haute Qualité Environnementale ("High Quality Environment") project, although the latter gives particular stress to use of more local species, at least outdoors.

In 2009 he was awarded an Honorary Fellow of the Royal Institute of British Architects.

Works
 Green walls
 1988 : green wall, made at the Museum of Science and Industry in Paris
 1998 : Fondation Cartier in Paris
 2000 : Aquarium of Genoa, Italy
 2001 : Perhsing Hall Hotel in Paris
 2003 : Marithé & François Girbaud boutique in Manhattan
 2003 : French Embassy in New Delhi
 2004 : Green façade at the Administrative building of the Quai Branly Museum in Paris
 2004 : 21st Century Museum of Contemporary Art, Kanazawa, Japan.
 2005 : North face of the shopping centre in Avignon
 2005 : Vinet Square in Bordeaux (with Michel Desvigne)
 2005 : Siam Paragon shopping center in Bangkok
 2006 : Weleda, 8th arrondissement of Paris
 2007 : BHV Hommes shop  (BHV for men), 4th arrondissement of Paris
 2007 : CaixaForum Madrid
 2008 : Arch at the roundabout  at the Grand Theatre of Provence at Aix-en-Provence
 2008 : Galeria Przymorze, shopping centre in Gdańsk, Poland
 2008 : Melbourne Central Shopping Centre, Australia
 2008 : Galeries Lafayette, Berlin Friedrichstraße, Germany
 2009 : The Athenaeum Hotel, Piccadilly, London, UK 
 2009 : 360 Mall, Kuwait
 2010 : Ronald Lu & Partners, Hong Kong
 2014 : Central Park, Sydney
 2016 : Le Nouvel Towers, Kuala Lumpur
 2018 : Museum of Contemporary Art, Busan

Other works
 1994 : Garden Festival of Chaumont-sur-Loire

Bibliography
 1990 : Biologie d'une canopée de forêt équatoriale : rapport de Mission Radeau des cimes, octobre-novembre 1989, Petit Saut, - Guyane française, ("Biology under an equatorial forest: report of Study Radeus, October–November 1989, French Guiana, a collective study under the direction of Francis Hallé et Patrick Blanc, Departement of Industry and xylochemistry
 2002 : Être plante à l'ombre des forêts tropicales ("Putting plants in the light of tropical forests"), Éditions Nathan
 2005 : Le bonheur d'être plante, ("The pleasure of being a plant"), Éditions Maren Sell
 2007 : Folies végétales ("Plants' follies"), (lecture, Paris), éditions Chêne
 2008 : Le Mur Végétal, de la nature à la ville ("The green wall in town and country"), éditions Michel Lafon

See also
Green roof
Urban agriculture
List of gardening topics
Hanging Gardens of Babylon

Gallery

References

External links

 Patrick Blanc's homepage
 InFrame.tv video interview with Patrick Blanc which includes footage of the construction of his vertical garden in Melbourne, Australia
 'All His Rooms Are Living Rooms', New York Times, 3 May 2007
 Interview with Patrick Blanc by Ping magazine.

20th-century French botanists
1953 births
Living people
21st-century French botanists